Major General Sir Thomas Makdougall Brisbane, 1st Baronet,  (23 July 1773 – 27 January 1860), was a British Army officer, administrator, and astronomer. Upon the recommendation of the Duke of Wellington, with whom he had served, he was appointed governor of New South Wales from 1821 to 1825.

A keen astronomer, he built the colony's second observatory and encouraged scientific and agricultural training. Rivals besmirched his reputation and the British Secretary of State for the Colonies, Lord Bathurst, recalled Brisbane and his colonial secretary Frederick Goulburn. Brisbane, a new convict settlement, was named in his honour and is now the 3rd largest city in Australia.

Early life
Brisbane was born at Brisbane House in Noddsdale, near Largs in Ayrshire, Scotland, the son of Sir Thomas Brisbane and his wife Eleanora (née Bruce). He was educated in astronomy and mathematics at the University of Edinburgh. He joined the British Army's 38th (1st Staffordshire) Regiment of Foot in 1789 and had a distinguished career in Flanders, the West Indies, Spain and North America. He served under the Duke of Wellington, and in 1813 he was promoted to major general. He saw much action during the Peninsular War, including leading a brigade in the 3rd Division that broke through at the Battle of Vitoria. He continued as a brigade commander in the War of 1812, where in 1814 he led a brigade at the Battle of Plattsburgh, which Brisbane claimed they could have won if they had been allowed to launch a full infantry attack.

During the battle, he used the Charles C. Platt Homestead as his headquarters. For his services in the Peninsula, Brisbane received the Army Gold Cross with one clasp for the battles of Vitoria, the Pyrenees, Nivelle, Orthez, and Toulouse; and the silver war medal with one clasp for the Nive.

In November 1819 he married Anna Maria Hay Makdougall of Makerstoun, Roxburghshire, Scotland. On his father-in-law's death, Brisbane assumed the additional surname, becoming Makdougall Brisbane.

Governor
In 1821, on the recommendation of Wellington, Brisbane was appointed Governor of New South Wales, a post he held until 1825. Brisbane took over the government on 1 December 1821, and at once proceeded to carry out some of the reforms recommended in the report of John Bigge. While Governor he tackled the many problems of a rapidly growing and expanding colony. He worked to improve the land grants system and to reform the currency.

Brisbane's keen interest in science led him to accept the invitation to become the first President of the Philosophical Society of Australasia that later became the Royal Society of New South Wales.  He also set up the first agricultural training college in New South Wales and was the first patron of the New South Wales Agricultural Society. He conducted experiments in growing tobacco, cotton, coffee and New Zealand flax in the colony.

However, Brisbane did not always receive loyal support from his administrative officers, and in particular from Frederick Goulburn, the colonial secretary. A reference to Brisbane's dispatch to Earl Bathurst dated 14 May 1825 shows that Bigge's recommendations had been carefully considered, and that many improvements had been made. Brisbane did not limit his attention to Bigge's report.

Early in April 1822, he discovered with some surprise the ease with which grants of land had hitherto been obtained. He immediately introduced a new system under which every grant had the stipulation that for every  granted the grantee would maintain free of expense to the crown one convict labourer. He also encouraged agriculture on government land, streamlined granting of tickets of leave and pardons and introduced, in 1823, a system of calling for supplies by tender. When Dr. Robert Wardell and William Wentworth brought out their paper the Australian in 1824, Brisbane tried the experiment of allowing full latitude of the freedom of the press.

In 1823, Brisbane sent Lieutenant John Oxley to find a new site for convicts who were repeat offenders. Oxley discovered a large river flowing into Moreton Bay. A year later, the first convicts arrived at Moreton Bay. Brisbane visited the settlement in December 1824. Oxley suggested that both the river and the settlement be named after Brisbane. The convict settlement was declared a town in 1834 and opened to free settlement in 1839.

Brisbane was doing useful work, but he could not escape the effects of the constant faction fights which also plagued previous governors. Henry G. Douglass, the assistant-surgeon, was the centre of one of the bitter conflicts. Consequently, charges of various kinds against Brisbane were sent to England. The worst of these, that he had connived at sending female convicts to Emu Plains for immoral purposes, was investigated by William Stewart, the lieutenant-governor, John Stephen, assistant judge, and the Rev. William Cowper, senior assistant-chaplain, and found to be without the slightest foundation.

Brisbane discovered that Goulburn, the colonial secretary, had been withholding documents from him and answering some without reference to the governor, and in 1824 reported his conduct to Lord Bathurst. In reply, Bathurst recalled both the governor and the colonial secretary in dispatches dated 29 December 1824.

Astronomer

Brisbane was a keen astronomer throughout his career. He had an observatory built at his ancestral home in 1808. From this observatory he was able to contribute to the advances in navigation which took place over the next hundred years. He took telescopes, books and two astronomical assistants, Carl Ludwig Christian Rümker and James Dunlop to New South Wales with him. On arrival he had the first properly-equipped Australian observatory built at Parramatta while waiting for his predecessor, Governor Macquarie to complete his final arrangements.

The Parramatta observatory recorded stars of the southern hemisphere, the first detailed observations from the continent. Its major contribution was Rümker's rediscovery of Encke's comet in 1822. Brisbane left his equipment and books in the colony when he returned to Scotland. Remnants of this collection survive in the Sydney Observatory.

Later years
Brisbane left Sydney in December 1825 and returned to Scotland. In 1826 he was made colonel of the 34th (Cumberland) Regiment of Foot. He added the name of Makdougall before Brisbane, and settled down to the life of a country gentleman and took interest in science, his estate, and his regiment. He was elected president of the Royal Society of Edinburgh (1832) following the death of Sir Walter Scott, and in 1836 he was created a baronet. In the same year he was offered the command of the troops stationed in Canada and two years later the chief command in India, but declined both. He continued his astronomical researches, and did valuable work.

He was the first patron of science in Australia, and as such was eulogised by Sir John Herschel when he presented Brisbane with the gold medal of the Royal Astronomical Society in 1828. Oxford and Cambridge universities gave him the honorary degree of DCL, and he was elected a fellow of the Royal Societies of both London and Edinburgh. He was created Knight Commander of the Order of the Bath in 1814 and Knight Grand Cross of the Order of the Bath in 1837.

In 1828, he won the Gold Medal of the Royal Astronomical Society. He published The Brisbane Catalogue of 7,385 stars of the Southern Hemisphere in 1835. The Observatory was used until 1855.

When Brisbane returned to Scotland he continued his studies and built a further observatory on his wife's estate, Makerstoun, near Kelso in the Borders. He was a member of the Royal Society of Edinburgh and received its Keith Medal in 1848. In 1833 he acted as president of the British Association for the Advancement of Science. He founded a gold medal for the encouragement of scientific research to be awarded by the Royal Society of Edinburgh.

Brisbane died on 27 January 1860 in Largs. His four children predeceased him. He is buried in the Brisbane Aisle Vault, which is in the small kirkyard next to the remains of Largs Old Kirk (known as Skelmorlie Aisle).

Legacy
The following features are named after Thomas Brisbane:

 Brisbane, the Australian state of Queensland's largest city and capital.
 Brisbane River in Queensland, Australia.
 Brisbane, a crater on the Moon.
 Brisbane Street, Greenock
 Brisbane Street, Hobart, Tasmania
 Brisbane Street, Perth, Western Australia
 Brisbane Water, an estuary on the Central Coast of New South Wales.
 Sir Thomas Brisbane Planetarium, located in Brisbane, Queensland.
 Noddsdale, the glen near Largs where his birthplace Brisbane House was situated, was renamed Brisbane Glen in his honour.
 Isabella Plains, a suburb in Canberra, named in honour of Isabella Brisbane, a daughter of Sir Thomas.
 Brisbane House Hotel in Largs, a town located by the sea in North Ayrshire, Scotland.
 Thomas Makdougall Brisbane bridge in Largs
 Makdougall Brisbane prize of the Royal Society of Edinburgh.
Many other uses of Brisbane derive from the Australian city and hence are indirectly named after Thomas Brisbane.

See also
Historical Records of Australia

Notes

References

External links

Thomas M. Brisbane papers, William L. Clements Library, University of Michigan.

1773 births
1860 deaths
People from Largs
Alumni of the University of Edinburgh
Scottish soldiers
34th Regiment of Foot officers
British Army major generals
British Army personnel of the Napoleonic Wars
British Army personnel of the War of 1812
Scottish astronomers
Scottish politicians
Fellows of the Royal Society
Presidents of the Royal Society of Edinburgh
Baronets in the Baronetage of the United Kingdom
Knights Grand Cross of the Order of the Bath
Recipients of the Gold Medal of the Royal Astronomical Society
Governors of New South Wales
Australian penal colony administrators
Recipients of the Army Gold Cross
History of Brisbane
Colony of New South Wales people